Big Shot is a pinball machine designed by Ed Krynski and produced by Gottlieb in 1973. It was created as a two player version of their 1973 game, Hot Shot. The table is pool themed and is very popular among skilled players and collectors, because of the skill required to hit all 14 drop targets in the game. 2,900 units were manufactured.

Game Play 
The goal of the game is to light all 15 billiard ball lights. The player must hit the ball drop targets on either side of a central bumper to light its corresponding ball light, except the 8 ball. The 8 ball is lit by either going through the middle gate or by stopping in the center pit. When stopped in the center pit, a diverter (also called a gate) will change position, allowing a ball drained in the right outlane to return to the plunger lane. Once all the ball lights are lit, the special can be achieved by hitting the target on the special lit side. The light switches sides when the slingshots are hit. Replays can be achieved by hitting the special lit side and by earning 50,000 points, 64,000 points, and 72,000 points.

Digital versions 
Big Shot is available as a licensed table of The Pinball Arcade for several platforms, and can be adjusted for three ball or five ball play.

This game is also included in the Pinball Hall of Fame: The Gottlieb Collection for the Nintendo GameCube, Xbox, Wii, PlayStation 2, and PlayStation Portable. The game has goals that players must achieve to open a secret in the game. In the Gamecube/Xbox/PS2 version, the table's goal is to drop all fourteen drop targets and light the eight ball. When the player achieves this, an unlockable will be given. In the Wii/PSP version however, the table's goal is to clear either one side of drop targets (either solids or stripes) including the eight ball, when the player achieves this it will unlock a table for free play and it is incorrectly marked as released in 1974 on some digital versions.

See also
Cue Ball Wizard - a cue sports themed pinball machine by Gottlieb
Eight Ball Deluxe - a cue sports themed pinball machine by Bally

References

External links
 IPDB Listing for Big Shot

1974 pinball machines
Gottlieb pinball machines